Haukr or Hauk Erlendsson (died 1334; Modern  ) was lawspeaker (lawman) of Iceland, later lawspeaker and knight of Norway, known for having compiled a number of Icelandic sagas and other materials mostly in his own hand, bound in a book called the Hauksbók after him.

Life

Hauk was born the son of  aka Erlend digre "the fat," who died 1312. The year of Haukr's birth is not known, but his mother's name was Jorunn, whose ancestry is traceable to a brother of King Halfr of Hordaland, hero of Hálfs saga ok Hálfsrekka.

Hauk may have been an illegitimate offspring, although the question of whether his mother was Erlend's "first wife or mistress" is an open speculation. At any rate it is clear Hauk had a stepmother at some point, since Jarngerd is called Erlend's wife in the Landnamabók and this Jarngerd was beyond doubt the wife who survived Erlend's death in 1312. Hauk also had a half-sister named Valgerd, born to Jarngerd.

Hauk married Steinunn, a descendant of Hrafn Sveinbjornsson.

Hauk's father Erlend became lawspeaker (lögmaðr)  of  Iceland in 1287, went overseas in 1289, retired as lawspeaker and was awarded the Westfjords in 1290 or 1292 according to some sources. Somewhere along, though not in his early years, Hauk was educated abroad in Norway, where "he owes his whole education".

Like his father before him, Hauk became lawspeaker of Iceland no later than 1294, serving the post until 1299.  Around 1301 he arrived in Norway, and served from 1303 to 1322 as lawspeaker in Oslo and on the Gula Thing. Sometime after 1303, he is mentioned as being on the king's council. He was also one of the men who ruled to recognize Magnus IV of Sweden as king over Norway.

During this period, lawmen may or may not be conferred the title of herra (at least those in Iceland), at any rate, Hauk serving in Norway is addressed as "herra" in a 1309 letter, and in a letter dating from 1311, he is called "the lawspeaker of the Gula Thing and knight."

Works
The Hauksbók is a compilation that includes Icelandic sagas and a redaction of the Landnámabók, as well as an arithmetical treatise called the Algorismus. Among the sagas included is a version of Eiríks saga rauða, which includes the accounts of the exploration and the attempted colonization in the American continent by Thorfinn Karlsefni, whom Hauk counts as one of his ancestors. He also penned "Hauk's Annals," which chronicled the events of his lifetime.

Family tree
The following stemma is drawn from the genealogy appended to the last chapter of Eiríks saga rauða in Hauk's own recension (in the Hauksbók, supplemented with additional information from the Landnámabók).

{{Tree chart | |GRANDPA|y|VALGERD|GRANDPA=Olaf(?){{Refn|Erlend's patronymic given as "Erlendr Ólafsson sterki" in the Index to Diplomatarium islandicum, Vol. II, p. 951}}|VALGERD=Valgerd Flosadottir
|boxstyle_GRANDPA=border:none
}}

Footnotes

Explanatory notes

Citations

References

Landnámabók
, edition cited by Munch.
, Part III, Ch. X
Documentary sources
 copy
Studies

Repr. in Munch, Samlede Afhandlinger'' I, 299-333
 
 

1334 deaths
Lawspeakers
13th-century births
14th-century Icelandic people
14th-century Norwegian writers
Year of birth unknown
Date of death unknown
Medieval Icelandic writers